The Maltese Second Division (also known as the BOV Second Division due to sponsorship reasons) was the third-highest division in Maltese football until 2020 when it was merged with the Maltese Third Division to create the National Amateur League.

Structure 

13 clubs formed the league and each played every other club twice. Three points were awarded for a win, one for a draw and zero for a loss. At the end of the season, the top two teams were promoted to the First Division, while the bottom two were relegated to the Third Division. The team which placed third played a play-off against the third-last team from the First Division with the winner earning a place in the latter's successive season. The 11th-placed team in this league had to contest a similar play-off against the third-placed team of the Third Division, to determine a place in the following season's Second Division.

2018-19 season 

The following 13 clubs are competing in the Second Division during the 2018–19 season.

History

External links 
 
 League at MaltaFootball.com
 League at Soccerway

 
3
Third level football leagues in Europe